The chiefs of the Scottish highland Clan Munro, the Munros of Foulis, are according to tradition, descended from a Donald Munro of Foulis who died in 1039. However, their descent can only be proved by contemporary evidence back to a Robert de Munro who died in 1369.

According to 19th-century historian Alexander Mackenzie, the chiefs of the Clan Munro are from as early as the 12th century designated Barons of Foulis. However, although the family line can be proved back to Robert de Munro (d.1369) by contemporary evidence, it cannot be proved that they were all actually Barons before they were made Baronets by Charles I in the 1630s. Strictly speaking Robert Mor Munro (d.1588) who Mackenzie designates the 15th Baron was the first true Baron although the Munro chiefs had previously held their lands from the Earl of Ross and directly from the crown for centuries before that.

In the 1630s, Hector Munro of Foulis, traditionally the 19th Baron and 22nd chief of the clan was made a Baronet by king Charles I, thus becoming Sir Hector Munro, 1st Baronet of Foulis. In 1651, Sir Hector Munro, 2nd Baronet of Foulis died without issue. He was succeeded by his cousin Sir Robert Munro, 3rd Baronet, the eldest male representative of the Munro of Obsdale branch of the Clan Munro, who are descended from chief Robert Mor Munro, 15th Baron of Foulis (d.1588).

In 1848, Sir Hugh Munro, 8th Baronet of Foulis died leaving an only daughter. He was succeeded by his cousin Sir Charles Munro, 9th Baronet who was in fact the eldest male representative of the Munro of Culrain branch of the clan. The Munros of Culrain descend from George Munro, 1st of Newmore who was a son of Col. John Munro, 2nd of Obsdale, who was in turn a grandson of chief Robert Mor Munro, 15th Baron of Foulis (d.1588). Some modern historians have claimed that the Munros of Culcairn, who are descended from George Munro, 1st of Culcairn, who was in turn a son of Sir Robert Munro, 5th Baronet (d.1729) should have become chiefs. It has been claimed, although not proven that because the Munro of Culcairn family was living in London, England, it was assumed that they had died out, even though they had not.

In 1935, Chief Sir Hector Munro, 11th Baronet died and was succeeded to the chiefship of the Clan Munro by his daughter, Eva Marion Munro. However, the Baronetcy was succeeded to by Sir George Hamilton Munro, 12th Baronet, grandson Sir Charles Munro, 9th Baronet. Therefore, the chiefship of the Clan Munro and Baronetcy of Foulis became separated as the baronetcy could not pass to a female. See article: Munro Baronets.

Eva Marion Munro married Col C. H. Gascoigne. Their son, Patrick, took his mother's maiden name, Munro, in order to become chief of the clan. The current chief of the clan is his son, Hector William Munro.

Chiefs

Modern line

Foulis line

Original of Foulis line

Traditional chiefs

The earliest ten chiefs of the Clan Munro cannot be confirmed by contemporary evidence. George Munro traditionally the 7th Baron is recorded as the first chief in the Munro MS history written by George Martine between 1673 and 1697. Robert Munro traditionally the 6th Baron is recorded as receiving a charter during the reign of Robert the Bruce in William Robertson's Index of Charters, compiled in 1629 and published in 1798, but this charter cannot be found. George Munro traditionally the 5th Baron is recorded by 18th-century historian Alexander Nisbet as being on a charter of the early 13th century but this charter cannot be found either.

See also
Clan Munro
Munro Baronets
Foulis Castle

References

Chiefs of Clan Munro
Munro